Mayodia Pass ( elevation), 56 km from Roing in Dibang Valley district of Arunachal Pradesh state in India, is a popular local tourist attraction due to the November to March winter snow fall which is heaviest in January and February.

Etymology

"Mayodia" is the combination of two Idu-Mishmi words - "Mayu" which is the name of the mountain and "Dia" meaning "peak of the mountain", thereby meaning "Peak of the Mayu Mountain".  It is a frequent domestic tourist attraction for the snow fall it receives during winters. Nearest town is Roing (56 km).

Climate

Summer (March–June): The temperature ranges from 15 to 30 degree Celsius.

Monsoon (July–August) : Monsoon starts during the month of July. Visiting Mayodia during this time may be difficult due to unpredictable road condition.

Winter (October -January): It is the peak tourist season and the best time to visit Mayodia.

Transport

Road

Mayodia can be easily reached by road from all major cities of Assam. Tourists can either hire a car or get Arunachal Pradesh State Transport(APSTS) bus services via national highway to Roing.

Train

The nearest railway station is Tinsukia Junction. From the junction Tourist have to take bus to Roing  at a cost of Rs 200 per person. From Roing it is  about 3 hours journey to Mayodia and this journey must be completed during day time due to unpredictable road condition.

Airway

The Roing helipad is 53 km away, Pasighat Airport is 148 km, Dibrugarh Airport is 190 km and Tezu airport is 105km away. Tourist can hire a car or take  Arunachal Pradesh State Transport (APSTC) bus service.

See also

 Geography of Dibang Valley
 List of mountain passes of India

References

Dibang Valley district
Cities and towns in Dibang Valley district